Pachyrhabda antinoma is a moth of the family Oecophoridae first described by Edward Meyrick in 1910. It is found in New Zealand at the Kermadec Islands and has also been collected in Australia.

References

Stathmopodidae
Moths described in 1910
Moths of New Zealand
Endemic fauna of New Zealand
Taxa named by Edward Meyrick
Fauna of the Kermadec Islands
Endemic moths of New Zealand